State Highway 36 (Odisha) is a state highway in Ganjam district of the Indian state of Odisha.

It connects Surada to Purushottampur via Hinjilicut. It begins from National Highway 59 (India) and ends at State Highway 32 (Odisha).

References

36